Young was an electoral district of the House of Assembly in the Australian state of South Australia from 1938 to 1956.

At its inception, the electorate included Alford, Blyth, Brinkworth, Bute, Cunliffe, Everard Central, Hart, Koolunga, Kulpara, Kybunga, Lochiel, Melton, Mundoora, Ninnes, Paskeville, Percyton, Port Broughton, Redhill, Rochester, Snowtown, South Hummocks, Thomas Plains, Thrington, Tickera, Wandilta Mines (now in northeastern Kadina), Wokurna and Yacka.

Members

Election results

References 

Former electoral districts of South Australia
1938 establishments in Australia
1956 disestablishments in Australia